School of Rock is an American musical-comedy television series developed by Jim Armogida and Steve Armogida that premiered on Nickelodeon on March 12, 2016. It ran for three seasons, with its final episode airing on April 8, 2018. The series is based on the 2003 film of the same name and stars Breanna Yde, Ricardo Hurtado, Jade Pettyjohn, Lance Lim, Aidan Miner, Tony Cavalero, and Jama Williamson.

Series overview

Episodes

Season 1 (2016)

Season 2 (2016–17)

Season 3 (2017–18)

References 

Lists of American children's television series episodes
Lists of American comedy television series episodes
Lists of Nickelodeon television series episodes